Consul, described by Pieter Cramer in 1776, is a South American nymphalid butterfly genus in the subfamily Charaxinae.

Species
There are four species in the genus. All are Neotropical.

 Consul electra (Westwood, 1850) – pearly leafwing
 Consul excellens (Bates, 1864) – black-veined leafwing
 Consul fabius (Cramer, 1776) – tiger leafwing
 Consul panariste (Hewitson, 1856) – tricoloured leafwing

Consul fabius is the most common and well known. It occurs from Mexico to Bolivia in deciduous forest, rainforest, and cloud forest, at elevations between sea level and about 1200 m. The larvae feed on several species of Piperaceae. It is part of a mimicry ring and also mimics dead leaves.

References

External links
TOL
"Consul Hübner, [1807]" at Markku Savela's Lepidoptera and Some Other Life Forms
Biolib

Anaeini
Nymphalidae of South America
Taxa named by Pieter Cramer
Butterfly genera